The La Crosse Municipal Transit Utility or MTU is the primary provider of mass transportation in La Crosse, Wisconsin. Using 21 buses, eleven regular routes are provided from Monday through Friday. On Saturdays, the MTU runs six routes, and five routes on Sundays.

History

Public transit in La Crosse began with the opening of a horse-drawn streetcar line in 1879. Over time, more streetcar lines were added and in 1893, all streetcars had been electrified. Beginning in the early 20th century however, increasing car ownership led to a decline of the privately run streetcar system. As a result, buses began to replace streetcars throughout the city and by November 1945, the last streetcar line closed. The City of La Crosse took over operations of the buses in 1975 from the Mississippi Valley Public Service Company, as the buses could no longer be operated profitably.

In 1945, in the first timetable after streetcar service had ended, there were four bus routes. The earliest bus left at 5:40am and the last bus returned at 1:00am. Buses ran at a 10 to 15 minute headway throughout the day. In total, the buses provided 1519.95 hours of service per week. In 2022, the MTU provides only 1141.6 hours of service per week, a decline of 24.89%.

In 2019, a real time bus tracking mobile app was launched. The first two electric buses were introduced to the system on June 13, 2022, which was followed in October with the launch of a mobile app for fare payment.

Routes

Services Mon-Fri (5:12am–10:40pm) Sat (7:42am–7:40pm) Sun (7:42am–6:40pm):
Route 1: South Avenue
Route 2: Green Bay
Route 4: Losey Boulevard
Route 5: Valley View Mall
Route 6: Northside

Services Mon-Fri only
Route 7: French Island
Route 8: Crossing Meadows
Route 9: Onalaska
Ciculator Route 1
Circulator Route 2

Services Mon-Sat only:
Route 10: La Crescent Apple Express

Grand River Station

Grand River Station is the downtown transfer point for the majority of MTU routes and provides an MTU ticket counter along with retail and housing. The center opened on August 25, 2010, allowing transfers between MTU buses, intercity buses and commuter buses. Prior to the construction of Grand River Station, transfers between buses occurred by the Post Office at the intersection of 5th Avenue and State Street.

Ridership and service

Financial Information

Although the MTU does not recover all of its operating expenses through fares, neither does the local motor vehicle infrastructure recover any of its expenses through user fees.  In fact, not one cent of local road costs are paid for by the user, not to mention the abundant subsidized parking in the city.

Bus fleet

See also
 Scenic Mississippi Regional Transit
 La Crosse station
 Jefferson Lines
 Megabus
 Badger Bus
 List of intercity bus stops in Wisconsin
 List of bus transit systems in the United States

References

External links
La Crosse MTU

Bus transportation in Wisconsin
Bus transportation in Minnesota
La Crosse, Wisconsin